Eusapia is a genus of beetles in the family Cerambycidae, containing the following species:

 Eusapia amazonica (White, 1855)
 Eusapia guyanensis Huedepohl, 1988
 Eusapia matogrossensis Huedepohl, 1988

References

Hesperophanini